Barbara Ingram School for the Arts is a magnet high school that opened its doors for gifted art students in August 2009. Currently there are ten different majors: Theatre, Musical Theatre, Technical Theatre, Vocal Music, Instrumental Music, Dance, Creative Writing, Visual Arts, Computer Game Design and Animation, and Digital Communications. The Literary Arts program was added at the start of the 2011-2012 school year. The CGDA and Digital Communications were moved over from Washington County Technical High in the 2020-2021 year as they were no longer able to support the classes to the student class size needed. The school building is located adjacent to the Maryland Theatre in the arts and entertainment district of downtown Hagerstown, Washington County, Maryland, United States. Despite being a public school, applications and auditions are part of a process needed in order to be accepted and then enrolled. Barbara Ingram School is also unique in that it will accept students not only from all of Washington County but also from proximate Maryland counties and areas in nearby Pennsylvania and West Virginia. Rob Hovermale is the current principal. There are no sports teams originating from the school.

BISFA is named after the late Barbara Ingram, a Hagerstown native and former public school art teacher.

Performances and exhibitions

All-school musicals

2009–2010

The first all-school musical was Thoroughly Modern Millie and received rave reviews.

2010–2011

The all-school musical The Phantom of the Opera was performed during the 2010 to 2011 school year. Barbara Ingram School for the Arts was one of the first high schools to perform this musical. Not only was the performance well received, it is also considered a milestone in the revival of downtown Hagerstown.

2011–2012

The 2012 all school musical was Disney's Beauty and The Beast and ran for two weekends at the Maryland Theatre.

2012–2013

The 2013 Barbara Ingram was Legally Blonde and received some of the highest praise for acting. It was the final musical for the first full graduating class.

2013–2014

In August 2013, Barbara Ingram announced that its fifth all-school musical will be the classic The Wizard of Oz. It was performed in April 2014.

2014–2015

In April 2015, Shrek the Musical was performed by students from all departments.

2015–2016

In April 2016, Barbara Ingram performed "The little Mermaid" as their 7th all school musical.

2016–2017

In April 2017, Barbara Ingram presented "Seussical" at the Maryland Theater as their 8th musical.

2017–2018

In April 2018, Barbara Ingram presented “Hairspray” at the Maryland Theater as their 9th musical.

2018–2019

In April 2019, Barbara Ingram presented "Mamma Mia!" at the Maryland Theater as their 10th musical.

Additional performances
In the summer of 2010 thirty-seven vocalists traveled to New York City to perform in  Eric Whitacre's Paradise Lost: Shadows and Wings at Carnegie Hall. 
The dance department has also traveled to perform at the Orange Bowl.
In 2010, the choral ensemble had the opportunity to sing as the backup choir for Todd Rundgren's fall tour.
The Barbara Ingram Music Theatre Ensemble, the "Phantasmics", performed at Downtown Disney in Orlando Florida in the summer of 2011 and in Disney and Universal theme parks in 2012.
There are many performances year-round at the school, including the yearly Holiday Spectacular, in which all disciplines participate. Performances have occurred in The Maryland Theatre, in the downstairs "Black Box" of the main building, and at other locations around the community.

Mascot 
The Barbara Ingram school mascot is 'The Phantom,' alluding to the alleged ghost that haunts the lower level of the building. The school colors are purple, black and silver.

Notable alumni
Barbara Ingram's first class graduated in 2010. Since then, the senior class sizes have grown significantly. Many Barbara Ingram Alumni are working in Los Angeles, New York City, Orlando, and other cities across the country by utilizing the art skills they learned at BISFA. Others have remained in Hagerstown and work in a variety of roles including public school teachers, legislative staffers for state representatives, and even employees for Washington County Government.

References

External links
Official site
Washington County Public Schools: Barbara Ingram School for the Arts

Public schools in Washington County, Maryland
Schools in Hagerstown, Maryland
Magnet schools in Maryland
Performing arts in Maryland
2009 establishments in Maryland
Educational institutions established in 2009